The 2019 Longford Senior Football Championship is the 103rd running of the Longford GAA's premier club Gaelic football tournament for senior graded teams in County Longford, Ireland since the first County Championship was held in 1890 (102 completed since 1890, 1 started but not completed in 1891). The 2019 tournament consisted of 11 teams, with the winner going on to represent Longford in the Leinster Senior Club Football Championship. The championship starts with a group stage and then progresses to a knock out stage.

Mullinalaghta St. Columba's were the defending champions after they defeated Abbeylara after in the previous year's final replay.

This year was Rathcline's return to the top-flight for the first time since the 2016 season after claiming the 2018 Longford I.F.C. title. Interestingly the club also won the I.F.C. title in 2017 however they opted to stay in the middle grade for 2018 stating that "While we won the Intermediate Championship, it was decided to remain in the Intermediate championship for 2018 to allow our very young side develop further before embarking on Senior Championship".
 
On 6 October 2019 Killoe Young Emmets claimed their 12th Senior Football Championship title and their first since 2015 when defeating Longford Slashers 0-12 to 0-11 in an exciting and close final at Pearse Park.

Rathcline and St. Mary's Granard were supposed to be relegated to the I.F.C. for 2020, which should have ended their respective seven and one year tenures in the top-flight of Longford club football. However, due to the emergence of the COVID-19 pandemic and the desire to maintain a 12 team S.F.C. the two clubs were given a reprieve.

Team Changes

The following teams have changed division since the 2018 championship season.

To S.F.C.
Promoted from 2018 I.F.C.
 Rathcline - (Intermediate Champions)

From S.F.C.
Relegated to 2019 I.F.C.
 Ballymahon

Group stage
Groups A and B each consisted of 4 teams with 3 teams from each group progressing to the quarter-finals and last year's finalists being kept apart. Group C consisted of 3 teams, with 2 teams proceeding to the quarter-finals. The bottom finishers in each group were to play off to decide relegation to the 2019 I.F.C.

Group A

Round 1:
 Mullinalaghta 1-20, 1-6 Granard, 20/7/2019,
 Clonguish 0-12, 0-10 Dromard, 21/7/2019,

Round 2:
 Mullinalaghta 0-16, 2-6 Clonguish, 27/7/2019,
 Dromard 2-16, 0-10 Granard, 28/7/2019,

Round 3:
 Mullinalaghta 0-16, 0-9 Dromard, 11/8/2019,
 Clonguish 4-13, 0-4 Granard, 11/8/2019,

Group B

Round 1:
 Abbeylara 1-13, 1-12 Mostrim, 19/7/2019,
 Killoe Young Emmets 1-13, 0-9 Carrickedmond, 21/7/2019,

Round 2:
 Killoe Young Emmets 0-14, 1-11 Mostrim, 26/7/2019,
 Abbeylara 1-17, 2-9 Carrickedmond, 27/7/2019,

Round 3:
 Carrickedmond 0-11, 0-10 Mostrim, 10/8/2019,
 Killoe Young Emmets 1-12, 0-12 Abbeylara, 16/8/2019,

Group C

Round 1:
 Longford Slashers 2-12, 2-12 Colmcille, 20/7/2019,

Round 2:
 Colmcille 2-21, 0-9 Rathcline, 28/7/2019,

Round 3:
 Longford Slashers 0-14, 0-8 Rathcline, 9/8/2019,

Relegation playoff
The bottom placed teams from Groups A, B and C all compete in a Relegation Playoff in a round-robin format. The two lowest ranked teams after three matches will be relegated to the 2020 I.F.C.

Game 1:
 Rathcline 3-14, 1-16 Granard, Ardagh, 25/8/2019,

Game 2:
 Granard 1-11, 0-12 Mostrim, Clonguish, 30/8/2019,

Game 3:
 Mostrim 2-14, 1-13 Rathcline, Killoe, 11/9/2019,

Knockout stage
The top 8 teams from the league stages qualify for the quarter-finals.

Quarter-finals

Semi-finals

Final

Leinster Senior Club Football Championship

References

Longford SFC
Longford Senior Football Championship
Longford Senior Football Championship